Twelve ships of the French Navy have borne the name Entreprenant and  four Entreprenante, after the French word for "enterprising"

Ships named Entreprenant 
 , a 30-gun ship of the line, was started as Entreprenant
 , a  frigate-fireship 
 , a 6-gun fireship, bore the name
 , a 54-gun ship of the line 
 , a 74-gun 
 , a 74-gun 
 , an aviso, captured by the Royal Navy in 1800 
 , an aviso, captured by the Royal Navy in 1801 
 , exchanged with captives
 Entreprenant, captured and disposed of in 1808
 , an 18-gun brig, captured during the Invasion of Île de France. Broken up as unfit for Royal Navy service.
 , a 20-gun brig 
  (1917), an auxiliary patrol boat 
  (1940), a 

In addition to the naval vessels, a number of French privateers and other vessels have also borne the name.

Privateers named Entreprenante 
Entreprenante: On 7 April 1694  captured the privateer Entreprenante; the British Royal Navy took her into service as 
Entreprenant: On 13 March 1761, under the command of Captain Gamaliel Nightingale, captured the 44-gun Entreprenant, which however was armed en flute with only 26 guns. Still, the capture was sanguinary for both sides.
Entreprenante: On 2 December 1799 the British merchant ship  captured the French privateer corvette Entreprenante, of 18 guns and 130–195 men, off San Domingo in an engagement that was particularly sanguinary for the French.  

Ships named Entreprenante 
 Bayonnaise (1672), a barque, bore the name
 Entreprenante (1692), a 24-gun frigate, scuttled by fire at the Battle of Vigo Bay
 Entreprenante (1717), a longboat 
 Entreprenante (1858), a steam storeship

Citations and references

Citations

References
 
 

French Navy ship names